The 1982 UK Athletics Championships was the national championship in outdoor track and field for the United Kingdom held at Cwmbran Stadium, Cwmbran. It was the second time the event was held in the Welsh town, following on from the 1977 UK Athletics Championships. The women's 5000 metres race walk was dropped from the programme  for this championship.

It was the sixth edition of the competition limited to British athletes only, launched as an alternative to the AAA Championships, which was open to foreign competitors. However, due to the fact that the calibre of national competition remained greater at the AAA event, the UK Championships this year were not considered the principal national championship event by some statisticians, such as the National Union of Track Statisticians (NUTS). Many of the athletes below also competed at the 1982 AAA Championships.

David Ottley extended his unbeaten streak to five straight UK titles in the javelin throw. On the men's side,  Steve Barry (racewalk), Graham Eggleton (pole vault), Peter Gordon (discus throw) and Martin Girvan (hammer throw) also defended their 1981 UK titles. Fatima Whitbread was the only woman to repeat her victory, doing so in the javelin. No athlete won multiple titles at this edition, though Mike McFarlane and Bev Callender both won the 200 metres title and were runners-up in the 100 metres.

The main international track and field competition for the United Kingdom that year was the 1982 European Athletics Championships. Reflecting the secondary status of the UK event at national level, none of the British individual medallists there were present at UK Championships, though four relay medallists were on the UK podium: Bev Callender, Shirley Thomas, Todd Bennett, Phil Brown. The four countries of the United Kingdom competed separately at the Commonwealth Games that year as well, and UK champions who won there were men's 200 m champion Mike McFarlane, men's racewalker Steve Barry and women's shot putter Judy Oakes.

Medal summary

Men

Women

References

UK Athletics Championships
UK Outdoor Championships
Athletics Outdoor
Sport in Monmouthshire
Athletics competitions in Wales